AM-2233 is a drug that acts as a highly potent full agonist for the cannabinoid receptors, with a Ki of 1.8 nM at CB1 and 2.2 nM at CB2 as the active (R) enantiomer. It was developed as a selective radioligand for the cannabinoid receptors and has been used as its 131I derivative for mapping the distribution of the CB1 receptor in the brain. AM-2233 was found to fully substitute for THC in rats, with a potency lower than that of JWH-018 but higher than WIN 55,212-2.

It is notable for inducing tinnitus, though the reasons for this are unclear and may provide valuable insight into tinnitus research.

Legal Status

As of October 2015 AM-2233 is a controlled substance in China.

See also
 AM-679
 AM-694
 AM-1220
 AM-1221
 AM-1235
 AM-1241
 AM-2232
 Cannabipiperidiethanone
 FUBIMINA
 JWH-018
 List of AM cannabinoids
 List of JWH cannabinoids
 List of HU cannabinoids
 List of designer drugs

References

Benzoylindoles
AM cannabinoids
Aminoalkylindoles
Iodoarenes
Piperidines
Designer drugs